The brown-banded carder bee (Bombus humilis) is a bumblebee found in most of Europe west of Russia, with the exception of Ireland and Iceland. It is also found in Turkey, on the Tibetan plateau, northern China, eastern and southern Mongolia, and parts of North Korea.  In Britain, it is limited to the coast and chalkland areas of southern England. The brown-banded carder bee is similar in appearance to the moss carder bee. As they share similar habitats, care must be taken to distinguish between the two.

Description
The brown-banded carder bee is medium-sized with a relatively long tongue.

The thorax is usually yellow-orange on top, with beige flanks, but may be dark brown. Most of the abdomen is beige, too, although with a somewhat striped effect. Both queens (the reproductive females) and workers usually have a broad, dark brown band (hence the common name) on the upper side of the abdomen, near the front, although it can be missing on some workers.  A few black hairs - may only be one or two – are present on the thorax near the wing-bases. Males are similar to queens, but they lack stings and have longer antennae.

Colony Cycle 
Its flight period lasts from about May to September. The queen emerges from hibernation in the spring and makes a nest on the surface of the ground, preferable among grass tufts. The size of the nest is quite small, usually less than 100 inhabitants.

Habitat
The brown-banded carder bee favours vast grasslands. Among the plants visited are Trifolium pratense (red clover), Centaurea (knapweed) and Vicia (vetches).

Threats
The brown-banded carder bee is threatened by habitat loss due to intensive farming. As Goulson, Hanley, Darvill, Ellis, and Knight have pointed out, a contributing factor in the northern part of its distribution (including Britain) is that B. humilis, being near the edge of its latitudinal range, is not well adapted to local conditions, so is sensitive to habitat changes, especially loss of unimproved grassland meadows.

References 

 Biolib

Bumblebees
Hymenoptera of Europe
Insects described in 1806